Sarah Siskind (born April 15, 1978) is an American folk singer and songwriter.

Career
Siskind grew up in North Carolina in a musical household. She learned the piano at an early age, began writing songs at age eleven and recorded her first album at fourteen.

Her debut album, Covered (2002), was released independently and included appearances by jazz guitarist Bill Frisell and Jennifer Kimball. The album's songs were about love, family, and relationships.

Her song "Simple Love" was recorded by Alison Krauss on the album A Hundred Miles or More: A Collection (Rounder, 2007) and received a Grammy Award nomination for Best Female Country Vocal Performance. She toured with Bon Iver, who often finished his concerts with her song "Lovin's for Fools".

Siskind's songs have been recorded by Jeff Austin, Brendan Benson, Madi Diaz, Gabe Dixon, Ari Hest, Wynonna Judd, Claire Lynch, Della Mae, Angaleena Presley, Maia Sharp, Randy Travis, Curtis Wright, and the Infamous Stringdusters.

On April 17, 2020, Siskind released her album Modern Appalachia.

Discography
 Covered (2002)
 Studio.Living Room (2006)
 Say It Louder (2009)
 All Come Together Now (2010)
 Novel (2011)
 In The Mountains (2015)
 Modern Appalachia (2020)

As guest
 2001 Beat Hollow, Fognode
 2006 Sadlylove, Kate York
 2006 Don't Let the Stars Keep Us Tangled Up, Cortney Tidwell
 2008 Leavetaking, Peter Bradley Adams
 2009 Song Up in Her Head, Sarah Jarosz
 2010 Things That Fly, The Infamous Stringdusters
 2011 Guitar Slinger, Vince Gill
 2011 Follow Me Down, Sarah Jarosz
 2012 Mindy Smith, Mindy Smith
 2015 The Simple Truth, Jeff Austin

References

External links
 Official web site

American women singer-songwriters
American singer-songwriters
Living people
1978 births
21st-century American singers
21st-century American women singers